Trùng Quang Emperor (?–1414), real name Trần Quý Khoáng (陳季擴), was the second and last emperor of Later Trần dynasty. He was a son of prince Trần Ngạc. As the second son of Trần Nghệ Tông, Ngạc was appointed as Prime Minister with the title Trang Định vương (莊定王, "Prince Trang Định"), but was later killed by an order of Co-Prime Minister Hồ Quý Ly in 1392.

Giản Định revolted against Ming China in September 1408. Trùng Quang was appointed as a Palace Attendant (thị trung 侍中). In the next year, he was installed as the new emperor by Đặng Dung and Nguyễn Cảnh Dị in Chi La (modern Đức Thọ District, Hà Tĩnh Province). Giản Định was arrested by Nguyễn Suý, a general of Trùng Quang, then transferred to Nghệ An Province. Trùng Quang granted him the title thái thượng hoàng ("Retired Emperor").

Trùng Quang came to Bình Than to fight against the Chinese army, but was defeated by Zhang Fu and fled back to Nghệ An. He was captured in Hoá châu by Chinese army together with his generals around 1413, and was transferred to China. He drowned himself on the way to Yanjing (modern Beijing) in the next year.

References

|- style="text-align: center;"

|-

|-

|-

Trần dynasty emperors
1414 deaths
Year of birth unknown
15th-century Vietnamese monarchs
Vietnamese monarchs
Suicides by drowning in China